North Carolina Highway 710 (NC 710) is a primary state highway in the U.S. state of North Carolina. It connects the town of Pembroke to Interstate 74 (I-74) and U.S. Route 74 (US 74) and the nearby towns of Red Springs and Rowland.

Route description
NC 710 is a predominantly two-lane rural highway in the southern section of the state. Though it traverses geographically north-south, it is signed east-west, with its western and eastern points also geographically incorrect. NC 710 begins at its signed western terminus in a concurrency with NC 72 in downtown Red Springs, at the intersection of Main and Fourth Streets. Heading south, it splits from NC 72, which continues on to Lumberton. NC 710 skirts the western edge of Pembroke, connecting with NC 711, which goes through the town and UNC Pembroke. Crossing the Lumber River, it connects with US 74 Alternate, which was the former main highway in the area.  further south is I-74/US 74, where travelers can continue towards Rockingham or Wilmington.

History
NC 710 was established in 1935 as a new primary routing from NC 211 in Red Springs, to US 501/NC 130 northwest of Rowland. It has changed little since inception.

Junction list

References

External links

 
 NCRoads.com: N.C. 710

710
Transportation in Robeson County, North Carolina